Muck Glacier is a glacier between Campbell Cliffs and Sullivan Ridge in the Queen Maud Mountains. It flows generally northward from Husky Heights, and then eastward around the north end of Sullivan Ridge to enter Ramsey Glacier. Named by Advisory Committee on Antarctic Names (US-ACAN) for Maj. James B. Muck, USA, of the U.S. Army Aviation Detachment which supported the Texas Tech Shackleton Glacier Expedition to this area, 1964–65.

Glaciers of the Ross Dependency